Mafia & Fluxy are a British reggae rhythm section and production team, consisting of the brothers Leroy (bass) and David Heywood (drums), whose careers began with London reggae band The Instigators in 1977. They backed Jamaican artists on UK tours, and in 1987 visited Jamaica, building rhythm tracks for producers such as Bunny Lee, King Jammy, Donovan Germain and Philip "Fatis" Burrell, becoming one of the most in-demand rhythm sections of the ragga age. They started their own label, producing for artists such as Sugar Minott, King Kong, Gregory Isaacs, Johnny Osbourne, Cornell Campbell and General Levy.

They produced a series of Reggae Heights albums featuring classic singers such as Johnny Clarke, Barry Brown, Gregory Isaacs and John Holt singing classic tracks over rhythms recreated by Mafia & Fluxy.

The duo have also remixed tracks for artists such as Janet Jackson. Leroy Mafia has also enjoyed a solo career.

Discography

Solo albums
A New Galaxy of Dub, Ariwa
Revival Hits Vol. 1 (1992), Mafia & Fluxy
Revival Hits Vol. 2 (1994), Mafia & Fluxy
Mafia & Fluxy Present... (1994), RCA 
Revival Hits Vol. 3 (1994), Fashion. (1996), Mafia & Fluxy
Mafia & Fluxy Presents: Reggae Mega Hits Vol. 1 (1995), BMG
Dub Wicked: Michael Rose Meets Mafia & Fluxy at the Grass Roots of Dub (1997), Heartbeat
Mafia & Fluxy (1998), Mafia & Fluxy 
Mafia & Fluxy Presents: Roots & Culture Vol. 1 (1999), Mafia & Fluxy
Mafia & Fluxy Presents: Roots & Culture Vol. 2 (1998), Mafia & Fluxy
Mafia & Fluxy Presents: Music for Lovers, Vol. 1 (1999), Mafia & Fluxy
Introducing Lovers Revival Hits (1999), Distribution Fusion
Revival Hits Vol. 4 (2000), Mafia & Fluxy
Soul of the Gong (2000), Cactus
Mafia & Fluxy Presents: Music for Lovers Vol. 2 (2000), Mafia & Fluxy
Mafia & Fluxy Presents: Reggae Heights - John Holt (2001), Mafia & Fluxy
Mafia & Fluxy Presents: Reggae Heights - Gregory Issacs (2001), Mafia & Fluxy
Mafia & Fluxy Presents: Music for Lovers Vol. 3 (2001), Mafia & Fluxy
Mafia & Fluxy Presents: Roots & Culture Vol. 3 (2001), Mafia & Fluxy
Mad Professor Meets Mafia & Fluxy - Sci-Fi Dub Series, Pt. 1: From Mars with Dub (2002), Ariwa
Entebbe Sounds Meets Mafia & Fluxy - Propa Dubwise Pt. 1 (2002), Entebbe Sounds
Mafia & Fluxy Presents: Roots and Culture Vol. 4 (2002), Mafia & Fluxy
Mafia & Fluxy Presents: Music for Lovers Vol. 4 (2002), Mafia & Fluxy
Gussie P. Meets Mafia & Fluxy - Dub Wax: Book of Dub Vol. 1 (2003), Gussie P Records
Gussie P. Meets Mafia & Fluxy - Dub Wax: Book of Dub Vol. 2 (2004), Gussie P Records
A Reggae Christmas (2004), Mafia & Fluxy
Mafia & Fluxy Presents: Strictly Vocals (2004), Mafia & Fluxy
Entebbe Sounds Meets Mafia and Fluxy Propa Dubwise Pt. 1 (2004), Entebbe Sounds
Mafia & Fluxy Presents: Music for Lovers Vol. 5 (2004), Mafia & Fluxy
Mafia & Fluxy Presents: Music for Lovers Vol. 6 (2004), Mafia & Fluxy
Hot It Up - R'N'B and Dancehall Mixes (2x LP) (2005), Mafia & Fluxy
Mafia & Fluxy Presents: Roots and Culture Vol. 5 (200?), Mafia & Fluxy
Mafia & Fluxy Presents: Roots and Culture Vol. 6 (2006), Mafia & Fluxy
Mafia & Fluxy Presents: Strictly Vocals Vol. 2 (2006), Mafia & Fluxy
Zion Riddim by Mafia and Fluxy (2006), Mafia & fluxy
Mad Professor Meets Mafia & Fluxy - Sci-Fi Dub Series, Pt. 2: New Galaxy (2006), Ariwa
Rocking Time Riddim by Mafia & Fluxy (2007), Heartbeat
Borderline Riddim by Mafia & Fluxy (2007), Mafia & Fluxy
From R&B to Reggae, Vol. 1 (2007), Mafia & Fluxy
Mafia & Fluxy Presents: Reggae Heights - Barry Brown (2012) Mafia & Fluxy
Mafia & Fluxy Presents: Reggae Heights -  Johnny Clarke (2012) Mafia & Fluxy
Mafia & Fluxy Presents: Strictly Vocals Vol. 3 (2012), Mafia & Fluxy
Live and Love Riddim by Mafia & Fluxy (2012), Mafia & Fluxy
Bun N Cheese Riddim by Mafia & Fluxy (2012), Mafia & Fluxy

Participated Albums
Never Ending by Beres Hammond (2018), VP Records - Bass, Keyboards, Drums

References

External links
Masouri, John "They Got That Vibe" (interview), Echoes, September 11, 1999

Record production duos
British reggae musical groups
Dub musical groups
Lovers rock musicians
English musical duos
Reggae duos
Sibling musical duos
Male musical duos